Luiz Henrique Corrêa de Araújo or Luizinho is a Brazilian footballer.

Career
It began on Social Esportiva Vitória, then went to the Fabriciano and was loaned to various clubs and other Ceará, before returning in mid-2010 to Ceará.

Contract
 Ceará.

References

External links
zerozerofootball.com

1988 births
Brazilian footballers
Living people
Ceará Sporting Club players
Association football midfielders